Iffigsee is a lake near Lenk, in the canton of Berne, Switzerland. The lake is located in the Iffigtal, near Rawil Pass. To the south of the lake is the Wildhorn (3,248 metres).

See also
List of mountain lakes of Switzerland

References

Lakes of Switzerland
Bernese Oberland
Lakes of the canton of Bern
LIffigsee